Robert Étienne (18 January 1921 – 9 January 2009) was a 20th-century French historian of ancient Rome.

Career 
A student of the École Normale Supérieure and agrégé of history, Robert Étienne was member of the École française de Rome from 1947 to 1949. In 1958, he defended a doctoral thesis on the imperial cult in the Iberian Peninsula from Augustus to Diocletian.

Apart from a passage at the  CNRS as research attaché, he spent his entire career at the University of Bordeaux as an assistant, lecturer and teacher. He headed the Centre Pierre Paris, a unit associated with the CNRS and the French mission in Portugal.

Robert Étienne won the Prix Broquette-Gonin of the Académie française in 1962 and the Prix Thérouanne of the same Académie in 1967.

In 1988 he was elected corresponding member of the Académie des Inscriptions et Belles-Lettres and full member in 1999.

Publications 
1958: Le culte impérial dans la Péninsule ibérique d'Auguste à Dioclétien, Paris, BEFAR, 
1960: Le quartier Nord-Est de Volubilis
1962: Bordeaux antique (in collaboration with P. Barrère)
1966: La vie quotidienne à Pompéi, .
1970: Le siècle d'Auguste
1973: Les Ides de Mars : l'assassinat de César ou de la dictature ?
1986: Ausone ou les ambitions d'un notable aquitain
1987: Pompéi : La cité ensevelie, collection « Découvertes Gallimard » (nº 16), série Archéologie. Paris: Éditions Gallimard, new edition in 2009
Trad. into English by Caroline Palmer – Pompeii: The Day a City Died, "Abrams Discoveries" (New York: Harry N. Abrams) & 'New Horizons' (London: Thames & Hudson), 1992
1997: Jules César, Paris

References

External links 
 Robert Étienne on the site of the Académie des Inscriptions et Belles-Lettres
 Robert Étienne on the site of the Académie française
 Professeur Robert Etienne, La vie quotidienne à Pompéi (compte rendu) on Persée

Winners of the Prix Broquette-Gonin (literature)
20th-century French historians
French scholars of Roman history
École Normale Supérieure alumni
Members of the Académie des Inscriptions et Belles-Lettres
1921 births
People from Gironde
2009 deaths
Academic staff of the University of Bordeaux